Pipariya may refer to the following places:

 Pipariya, Hoshangabad, in Madhya Pradesh, India
 Pipariya, Jabalpur, in Madhya Pradesh, India
 Pipariya, Balaghat in Madhya Pradesh, India
 Pipariya, Bihar, in Bihar state, India
 Pipariya, Sarlahi, in Janakpur, Nepal
 Pipariya, Rautahat, in Narayani, Nepal